Collection One is the debut studio album by American rapper Saint Jhn. It was released on March 30, 2018, by Gødd Complexx under Hitco. The album peaked at No. 50 on the Billboard 200 and No. 7 on the Canadian albums in 2020.

Track listing

Charts

Weekly charts

Year-end charts

References

2018 debut albums
Saint Jhn albums